Oedipus Mayor  is a 1996 Colombian tragedy film, produced by Tomás Zapata and Jorge Sánchez, directed by Jorge Alí Triana. Set in strife-ridden, 20th-century Colombia, the film is a modern-day interpretation of Sophocles' classical Greek tragedy Oedipus Rex. The film was selected as the Colombian entry for the Best Foreign Language Film at the 69th Academy Awards, but was not accepted as a nominee.

Plot
Set amidst the rebel wars (representing the Theban plagues) of contemporary Colombia, young Mayor Edipo must mediate a peace deal between conflicting guerrilla groups and the army. It is raining when he leaves. His journey is interrupted when he gets into a shoot-out on a lonely bridge. Returning fire, Edipo somehow escapes. As soon as he gets to town he hears that a prominent leader Layo was brutally slain. No one knows who shot him. Meanwhile, a blind coffin-maker Tiresias wanders town making dire prophecies concerning Edipo's future. It is he who tells the mayor that Layo was murdered by a family member. Edipo's fate is sealed when he gets involved with the beautiful and much older Yocasta, a woman who last had sex thirty years before with her husband Layo. She got pregnant and bore a son ... tragedy ensues.

Cast
Jorge Perugorria - Edipo
Ángela Molina - Yocasta
Francisco Rabal - Tiresias
Jairo Camargo - Creonte
Jorge Martínez de Hoyos - Priest
Miriam Colón - Deyanira
Juan Sebastián Aragón - Police Commander
Armando Gutiérrez - Army Captain
Marcela Agudelo - 
Fabiana Medina - Guerrilla Child
Juan Carlos Arango - AUC Commander
Magali Caicedo
Manuel José Chávez - Guerrilla Child
Sigifredo Vega
Alfonso Ortiz - Landowners
Héctor Rivas
Andrés Felipe Martínez
Raúl Santa
Salomón Vega
Jaime Forero
Carlos Vega

See also
 List of submissions to the 69th Academy Awards for Best Foreign Language Film
 List of Colombian submissions for the Academy Award for Best Foreign Language Film

References

External links 
 

1996 films
Colombian drama films
1990s Spanish-language films
1990s war films
Films based on works by Sophocles
Films set in Colombia
Incest in film
1990s political films
Works based on Oedipus Rex
Modern adaptations of works by Sophocles